The 1834–35 United States House of Representatives elections were held on various dates in various states between July 7, 1834 and November 5, 1835. Each state set its own date for its elections to the House of Representatives before the first session of the 24th United States Congress convened on December 7, 1835. They were held during President Andrew Jackson's second term. Elections were held for 240 seats that represented 24 states, as well as the at-large-district seat for the pending new state of Michigan.

Jacksonians benefitted from the president's continued popularity and the tight party organization of the nascent Democratic Party to win a large majority of House seats for the new Congress. Their primary opponents, the Anti-Jacksonians, were coalescing and unifying as the Whig Party, reducing the influence of single-issue parties, the Anti-Masonic Party (an anti-Masonry movement) and the Nullifier Party (a John C. Calhoun-led states' rights party that supported South Carolina during the Nullification Crisis in 1832 and 1833). The Whig Party evolved from the National Republican Party and these minor parties. It appealed to diverse opponents of Jackson, including voters who perceived him as autocratic and brash, voters supporting greater spending and development on institutions and infrastructure, anti-Masons, and former Federalists. As the balance of power in the House remained unchanged, with Jacksonians holding 142 seats, this was the smallest loss by a President's party in the House as a result of the so-called six-year itch.

When the House convened in December 1835, future president James K. Polk, a staunch Jacksonian, was elected speaker. He defeated the incumbent speaker, John Bell, a Jacksonian who had split with the president on the national bank and other issues. Bell subsequently aligned himself with the Anti-Jacksonians in the 24th Congress.

Election summary 

Michigan was admitted during this Congress, adding 1 seat.

Special elections

23rd Congress 

|-
! rowspan=3 | 
| William W. Ellsworth
|  | Anti-Jacksonian
| 1829
|  data-sort-value="January 1, 1834" | Incumbent resigned July 8, 1834.New member elected in 1834 and seated December 1, 1834.Anti-Jacksonian hold.Successor later lost re-election, see below.
| rowspan=3 nowrap | 

|-
| Jabez W. Huntington
|  | Anti-Jacksonian
| 1829
|  data-sort-value="January 1, 1834" | Incumbent resigned August 16, 1834 to become judge of the Connecticut Supreme Court of Errors.New member elected in 1834 and seated December 1, 1834.Anti-Jacksonian hold.Successor was not a candidate to the next term see below.

|-
| Samuel A. Foot
|  | Anti-Jacksonian
| 1833
|  data-sort-value="January 1, 1834" | Incumbent resigned May 9, 1834 to become Governor of Connecticut.New member elected in 1834 and seated December 1, 1834.Anti-Jacksonian hold.Successor later lost re-election, see below.

|-
! 
| John Davis
|  | Anti-Jacksonian
| 1825
|  data-sort-value="January 14, 1834" | Incumbent resigned January 14, 1834 to become Governor of Massachusetts.New member elected February 17, 1834.Anti-Jacksonian hold.Successor seated March 5, 1834 and later re-elected, see below.
| nowrap | 

|-
! 
| Littleton Dennis
|  | Anti-Jacksonian
| 1833
|  data-sort-value="May 29, 1834" | Incumbent died April 14, 1834.New member elected May 29, 1834.Anti-Jacksonian hold.Successor seated June 9, 1834 and later re-elected, see below.
| nowrap | 

|-
! 
| James Blair
|  | Jacksonian
| 1828
|  data-sort-value="June 3, 1834" | Incumbent died April 1, 1834.New member elected June 3, 1834.Jacksonian hold.Successor later re-elected, see below.Successor seated December 8, 1834.
| nowrap | 

|-
! 
| colspan=3 | Vacant
|  data-sort-value="August 4, 1834" | 1833 election of Thomas Patrick Moore declared invalid.House ordered new election.New member elected August 4, 1834.Anti-Jacksonian gain.Successor seated December 1, 1834 and was not a candidate for the next term, see below.
| nowrap | 

|-
! 
| Humphrey H. Leavitt
|  | Jacksonian
| 1830 
|  data-sort-value="October 14, 1834" | Incumbent resigned July 10, 1834 to become U.S. District Judge.New member elected October 14, 1834.Jacksonian hold.Successor seated December 1, 1834 and also elected the same day to the next term, see below.
| nowrap | 

|-
! rowspan=2 | 
| Dudley Selden
|  | Jacksonian
| 1832
|  | Incumbent resigned July 2, 1834.New member elected November 3, 1834.Jacksonian hold.Successor seated December 1, 1834.
| rowspan=2 nowrap | 

|-
| Cornelius Lawrence
|  | Jacksonian
| 1832
|  | Incumbent resigned May 14, 1834 to become Mayor of New York City.New member elected November 3, 1834.Jacksonian hold.Successor seated December 1, 1834.

|-
! 
| Robert Todd Lytle
|  | Jacksonian
| 1832
|  data-sort-value="November 8, 1834" | Incumbent resigned March 10, 1834.Incumbent re-elected November 8, 1834, having already lost re-election, see below.Jacksonian hold.Incumbent re-seated December 27, 1834.
| nowrap | 

|-
! 
| Benjamin F. Deming
|  | Anti-Masonic
| 1833
|  data-sort-value="November 10, 1834" | Incumbent died July 11, 1834.Incumbent re-elected November 10, 1834.Anti-Masonic hold.Successor seated December 1, 1834 and also elected the same day to the next term, see below.
| nowrap | 

|-
! 
| Rufus Choate
|  | Anti-Jacksonian
| 1830
|  data-sort-value="November 10, 1834" | Incumbent resigned June 30, 1834.New member elected November 10, 1834.Anti-Jacksonian hold.Successor seated December 1, 1834 and also elected the same day to the next term, see below.
| nowrap | 

|-
! 

|-
! 

|-
! 

|-
! 

|-
! 

|-
! 

|-
! 

|-
! 

|}

24th Congress 

|-
! 
| Warren R. Davis
|  | Nullifier
| 1826
|  | Incumbent died January 29, 1835.New member elected September 8, 1835.Anti-Jacksonian gain.Successor seated December 7, 1835.
| nowrap | 
|
|-
! rowspan=4 | 
| James M. Wayne
|  | Jacksonian
| 1828
|  | Incumbent resigned January 13, 1835 to become Associate Justice of the U.S. Supreme Court.New member elected October 5, 1835.Jacksonian hold.Successor seated December 7, 1835.
| rowspan=4 nowrap | 

|-
| William Schley
|  | Jacksonian
| 1832
|  | Incumbent resigned July 1, 1835.New member elected October 5, 1835.Jacksonian hold.Successor seated December 7, 1835.

|-
| James C. Terrell
|  | Jacksonian
| 1834
|  | Incumbent resigned July 8, 1835.New member elected October 5, 1835.Jacksonian hold.Successor seated December 7, 1835.

|-
| John W. A. Sanford
|  | Jacksonian
| 1834
|  | Incumbent resigned July 25, 1835.New member elected October 5, 1835.Jacksonian hold.Successor seated December 7, 1835.

|-
! 
| Campbell P. White
|  | Jacksonian
| 1828
|  | Incumbent resigned.New member elected November 4, 1835.Jacksonian hold.Successor seated December 7, 1835.
| nowrap | 

|}

Alabama 

Alabama elected its members August 3, 1835, after the beginning of the term but before the House convened.

|-
! 

|-
! 

|-
! 

|-
! 

|-
! 

|}

Arkansas Territory 
See Non-voting delegates, below.

Connecticut 

Connecticut elected its members April 9, 1835, after the beginning of the term but before the House convened.

|-
! rowspan=6 | 
| Joseph Trumbull
|  | Anti-Jacksonian
| 1834 
|  | Incumbent lost re-election.New member elected.Jacksonian gain.
| rowspan=6 nowrap | 

|-
| Phineas Miner
|  | Anti-Jacksonian
| 1834 
|  | Incumbent retired.New member elected.Jacksonian gain.

|-
| Ebenezer Jackson Jr.
|  | Anti-Jacksonian
| 1834 
|  | Incumbent lost re-election.New member elected.Jacksonian gain.

|-
| Ebenezer Young
|  | Anti-Jacksonian
| 1829
|  | Incumbent lost re-election.New member elected.Jacksonian gain.

|-
| Noyes Barber
|  | Anti-Jacksonian
| 1821
|  | Incumbent lost re-election.New member elected.Jacksonian gain.

|-
| Samuel Tweedy
|  | Anti-Jacksonian
| 1833
|  | Incumbent lost re-election.New member elected.Jacksonian gain.

|}

Delaware 

Delaware re-elected its member November 11, 1834.

|-
! 
| John J. Milligan
|  | Anti-Jacksonian
| 1830
| Incumbent re-elected.
| nowrap | 

|}

Florida Territory 
See Non-voting delegates, below.

Georgia 

Elections were held October 6, 1834.

|-
! rowspan=9 | 
| James M. Wayne
|  | Jacksonian
| 1828
| Incumbent re-elected but declined the seat.Incumbent resigned January 13, 1835 to become Associate Justice of the U.S. Supreme Court.
| nowrap rowspan=9 | 

|-
| William Schley
|  | Jacksonian
| 1832
| Incumbent re-elected.

|-
| John E. Coffee
|  | Jacksonian
| 1832
| Incumbent re-elected.

|-
| Seaborn Jones
|  | Jacksonian
| 1832
|  | Incumbent retired.New member elected.Jacksonian hold.

|-
| Augustin S. Clayton
|  | Jacksonian
| 1831 
|  | Incumbent retired.New member elected.Jacksonian hold.

|-
| George R. Gilmer
|  | Jacksonian
| 18201822 1832
|  | Incumbent lost re-election.New member elected.Jacksonian hold.

|-
| Richard H. Wilde
|  | Jacksonian
| 18141816 1824 1824 1827 
|  | Incumbent lost re-election.New member elected.Jacksonian hold.

|-
| Thomas F. Foster
|  | Jacksonian
| 1828
|  | Incumbent lost re-election.New member elected.Jacksonian hold.

|-
| Roger L. Gamble
|  | Jacksonian
| 1832
|  | Incumbent lost re-election.New member elected.Jacksonian hold.

|}

Illinois 

Illinois elected its three members on August 4, 1834.

|-
! 
| colspan=3 | Vacant
|  | Rep. Charles Slade (J) died July 26, 1834.New member elected.Jacksonian hold.Winner was also elected to unexpired term, see above.
| nowrap | 

|-
! 
| Zadok Casey
|  | Jacksonian
| 1832
| Incumbent re-elected.
| nowrap | 

|-
! 
| Joseph Duncan
|  | Jacksonian
| 1826
|  | Incumbent retired to run for Governor of Illinois.New member elected.Jacksonian hold.
| nowrap | 

|}

Indiana 

Indiana elected its members August 3, 1835, after the beginning of the term but before the House convened.

|-
! 

|-
! 

|-
! 

|-
! 

|-
! 

|-
! 

|-
! 

|}

Kentucky 

Kentucky elected its members August 5, 1835, after the beginning of the term but before the House convened.

|-
! 

|-
! 

|-
! 

|-
! 

|-
! 

|-
! 

|-
! 

|-
! 

|-
! 

|-
! 

|-
! 

|-
! 

|-
! 

|}

Louisiana 

Louisiana elected its members July 7–9, 1834.

|-
! 

|-
! 

|-
! 

|}

Maine 

Maine elected its members September 8, 1834.

|-
! 

|-
! 

|-
! 

|-
! 

|-
! 

|-
! 

|-
! 

|-
! 
| Gorham Parks
|  | Democratic 
| 1833
| Incumbent re-elected.
| nowrap | 

|}

Maryland 

Maryland elected its members October 5, 1835, after the beginning of the term but before the House convened.

|-
! 

|-
! 

|-
! 

|-
! 

|-
! 

|-
! 

|-
! 

|-
! 

|}

Massachusetts 

Elections were held November 10, 1834, but at least one district's elections went to multiple ballots into 1835.

|-
! 

|-
! 

|-
! 

|-
! 

|-
! 

|-
! 

|-
! 

|-
! 

|-
! 

|-
! 
| William Baylies
|  | Whig
| 18081809 18121816 1833
|  | Incumbent lost re-election.New member elected on the third ballot.Democratic gain.
| nowrap | 

|-
! 
| John Reed Jr.
|  | Anti-Masonic
| 18121816 1820
| Incumbent re-elected.
| nowrap | 

|-
! 
| John Quincy Adams
|  | Anti-Masonic
| 1830
| Incumbent re-elected.
| nowrap | 

|}

Michigan 

Michigan elected its member October 5, 1835, after the beginning of the term but before the House convened.

The House refused to admit the member from Michigan due to a conflict with Ohio, so he was seated only as a non-voting delegate until January 27, 1837.

|-
! 
| colspan=3 | New seat
|  | Michigan was admitted to the Union on January 26, 1837.New member elected October 5, 1835.Jacksonian gain.The house refused to admit the member due to a conflict with Ohio, so he was seated only as a non-voting delegate until January 27, 1837.
| nowrap | 

|}

Michigan Territory 
See Non-voting delegates, below.

Mississippi 

Mississippi elected its members November 3–5, 1835, after the beginning of the term but before the House convened.

|-
! rowspan=2 | (2 seats)
| Franklin E. Plummer
|  | Jacksonian
| 1830
|  | Incumbent retired to run for U.S. senator.New member elected.Jacksonian hold.
| nowrap rowspan=2 | 
|-
| Harry Cage
|  | Jacksonian
| 1832
|  | Incumbent retired.New member elected.Anti-Jacksonian gain.

|}

Missouri 

Missouri elected its members August 3, 1835, after the beginning of the term but before the House convened.

|-
! rowspan=2 | 
|
|-
|
|}

New Hampshire 

New Hampshire elected its members March 10, 1835, after the beginning of the term but before the House convened.

|-
! rowspan=5 | 
|
|-
|
|-
|
|-
|
|-
|
|}

New Jersey 

New Jersey elected its members October 14, 1834.

|-
! rowspan=5 | 
|
|-
|
|-
|
|-
|
|-
|
|-
|
|}

New York 

New York elected its members November 3–5, 1834.

|-
! 

|-
! 

|-
! 

|-
! 

|-
! 

|-
! 

|-
! 

|-
! 

|-
! 

|-
! 

|-
! 

|-
! 

|-
! 

|-
! 

|-
! 

|-
! 

|-
! 

|-
! 

|-
! 

|-
! 

|-
! 

|-
! 

|-
! 

|-
! 

|-
! 

|-
! 

|-
! 

|-
! 

|-
! 

|-
! 

|-
! 

|-
! 

|-
! 

|-
! 

|-
! 

|-
! 

|-
! 

|-
! 

|-
! 

|-
! 

|}

North Carolina 

North Carolina elected its members August 13, 1835, after the beginning of the term but before the House convened.

|-
! 
| 
| 
| 
| 
|
|-
! 
| 
| 
| 
| 
|
|-
! 
| 
| 
| 
| 
|
|-
! 
| 
| 
| 
| 
|
|-
! 
| 
| 
| 
| 
|
|-
! 
| 
| 
| 
| 
|
|-
! 
| 
| 
| 
| 
|
|-
! 
| 
| 
| 
| 
|
|-
! 
| 
| 
| 
| 
|
|-
! 
| 
| 
| 
| 
|
|-
! 
| 
| 
| 
| 
|
|-
! 
| James Graham
|  | Anti-Jacksonian
| 1833
|  | Election result was disputed.House Committee on Elections awarded the election to the challenger, the full House voted to unseat the incumbent but then declined to seat the challenger, leaving the seat vacant.Anti-Jacksonian loss.
| nowrap | 

|-
! 
| 
| 
| 
| 
|
|}

Ohio 

Ohio elected its members October 14, 1834.

|-
! 

|-
! 

|-
! 

|-
! 

|-
! 

|-
! 

|-
! 

|-
! 

|-
! 

|-
! 

|-
! 

|-
! 

|-
! 

|-
! 

|-
! 

|-
! 

|-
! 

|-
! 

|-
! 

|}

Pennsylvania  

Pennsylvania elected its members October 14, 1834.

|-
! 
| Joel B. Sutherland
|  | Jacksonian
| 1826
| Incumbent re-elected.
| nowrap | 

|-
! rowspan=2 | 
| Horace Binney
|  | Anti-Jacksonian
| 1832
|  | Incumbent retired.New member elected.Anti-Jacksonian hold.
| rowspan=2 nowrap | 

|-
| James Harper
|  | Anti-Jacksonian
| 1832
| Incumbent re-elected.

|-
! 
| John G. Watmough
|  | Anti-Jacksonian
| 1830
|  | Incumbent lost re-election.New member elected.Jacksonian gain.
| nowrap | 

|-
! rowspan=3 | 
| William Hiester
|  | Anti-Masonic
| 1830
| Incumbent re-elected.
| rowspan=3 nowrap | 

|-
| Edward Darlington
|  | Anti-Masonic
| 1832
| Incumbent re-elected.

|-
| David Potts Jr.
|  | Anti-Masonic
| 1830
| Incumbent re-elected.

|-
! 
| Joel K. Mann
|  | Jacksonian
| 1830
|  | Incumbent retired.New member elected.Jacksonian hold.
| nowrap | 

|-
! 
| Robert Ramsey
|  | Jacksonian
| 1832
|  | Incumbent retired.New member elected.Anti-Jacksonian gain.
| nowrap | 

|-
! 
| David D. Wagener
|  | Jacksonian
| 1832
| Incumbent re-elected.
| nowrap | 

|-
! 
| Henry King
|  | Jacksonian
| 1830
|  | Incumbent retired.New member elected.Jacksonian hold.
| nowrap | 

|-
! 
| Henry A. P. Muhlenberg
|  | Jacksonian
| 1828
| Incumbent re-elected.
| nowrap | 

|-
! 
| William Clark
|  | Anti-Masonic
| 1832
| Incumbent re-elected.
| nowrap | 

|-
! 
| Charles A. Barnitz
|  | Anti-Masonic
| 1832
|  | Incumbent lost re-election.New member elected.Jacksonian gain.
| nowrap | 

|-
! 
| George Chambers
|  | Anti-Masonic
| 1832
| Incumbent re-elected.
| nowrap | 

|-
! 
| Jesse Miller
|  | Jacksonian
| 1832
| Incumbent re-elected.
| nowrap | 

|-
! 
| Joseph Henderson
|  | Jacksonian
| 1832
| Incumbent re-elected.
| nowrap | 

|-
! 
| Andrew Beaumont
|  | Jacksonian
| 1832
| Incumbent re-elected.
| nowrap | 

|-
! 
| Joseph B. Anthony
|  | Jacksonian
| 1832
| Incumbent re-elected.
| nowrap | 

|-
! 
| John Laporte
|  | Jacksonian
| 1832
| Incumbent re-elected.
| nowrap | 

|-
! 
| George Burd
|  | Anti-Jacksonian
| 1830
|  | Incumbent retired.New member elected.Jacksonian gain.
| nowrap | 

|-
! 
| Richard Coulter
|  | Jacksonian
| 1826
|  | Incumbent lost re-election.New member elected.Jacksonian hold.
| nowrap | 

|-
! 
| Andrew Stewart
|  | Anti-Masonic
| 18201828 1830
|  | Incumbent lost re-election.New member elected.Jacksonian gain.
| nowrap | 

|-
! 
| Thomas M. T. McKennan
|  | Anti-Masonic
| 1830
| Incumbent re-elected.
| nowrap | 

|-
! 
| Harmar Denny
|  | Anti-Masonic
| 1829 
| Incumbent re-elected.
| nowrap | 

|-
! 
| Samuel S. Harrison
|  | Jacksonian
| 1832
| Incumbent re-elected.
| nowrap | 

|-
! 
| John Banks
|  | Anti-Masonic
| 1830
| Incumbent re-elected.
| nowrap | 

|-
! 
| John Galbraith
|  | Jacksonian
| 1832
| Incumbent re-elected.
| nowrap | 

|}

Rhode Island 

Rhode Island elected its members August 25, 1835, after the beginning of the term but before the House convened.

|-
! rowspan=2 | 
|
|-
|
|}

South Carolina 

South Carolina elected its members October 13–14, 1834.

|-
! 

|-
! 

|-
! 

|-
! 

|-
! 

|-
! 

|-
! 

|-
! 

|-
! 

|}

Tennessee 

Tennessee elected its members August 5–6, 1835, after the beginning of the term but before the House convened.

|-
! 
| John Blair
|  | Jacksonian
| 1823
|  | Incumbent retired.New member elected.Anti-Jacksonian gain.
| nowrap | 

|-
! 
| Samuel Bunch
|  | Jacksonian
| 1833
|  |Incumbent re-elected.Anti-Jacksonian gain.
| nowrap | 

|-
! 
| Luke Lea
|  | Jacksonian
| 1833
|  |Incumbent re-elected.Anti-Jacksonian gain.
| nowrap | 

|-
! 
| James I. Standifer
|  | Jacksonian
| 1829
|  |Incumbent re-elected.Anti-Jacksonian gain.
| nowrap | 

|-
! 
| John B. Forester
|  | Jacksonian
| 1831
|  | Incumbent re-elected.Anti-Jacksonian gain.
| nowrap | 

|-
! 
| Balie Peyton
|  | Jacksonian
| 1833
|  |Incumbent re-elected.Anti-Jacksonian gain.
| nowrap | 

|-
! 
| John Bell
|  | Jacksonian
| 1827
|  | Incumbent re-elected.Anti-Jacksonian gain.
| nowrap | 

|-
! 
| David W. Dickinson
|  | Jacksonian
| 1833
|  | Incumbent retired.New member elected.Anti-Jacksonian gain.
| nowrap | 

|-
! 
| James K. Polk
|  | Jacksonian
| 1825 
| Incumbent re-elected.
| nowrap | 

|-
! 
| William M. Inge
|  | Jacksonian
| 1833
|  | Incumbent retired.New member elected.Anti-Jacksonian gain.
| nowrap | 

|-
! 
| Cave Johnson
|  | Jacksonian
| 1829 
| Incumbent re-elected.
| nowrap | 

|-
! 
| Davy Crockett
|  | Anti-Jacksonian
| 1833 
|  | Incumbent lost re-election.New member elected.Jacksonian gain.
| nowrap | 

|-
! 
| William C. Dunlap
|  | Jacksonian
| 1833 
| Incumbent re-elected.
| nowrap | 

|}

Vermont 

Vermont elected its members September 2, 1834.

|-
! 

|-
! 

|-
! 

|-
! 

|-
! 

|}

Virginia 

Virginia elected its members April 1835, after the beginning of the term but before the House convened.

|-
! 

|-
! 

|-
! 

|-
! 

|-
! 

|-
! 

|-
! 

|-
! 

|-
! 
| William P. Taylor
|  | Anti-Jacksonian
| 1833
|  | Incumbent lost re-election.New member elected.Jacksonian gain.
| 

|-
! 

|-
! 

|-
! 

|-
! 

|-
! 

|-
! 

|-
! 

|-
! 

|-
! 

|-
! 

|-
! 

|-
! 

|}

Non-voting delegates 

|-
! 
| Ambrose H. Sevier
|  | Jacksonian
| 1828  
| Incumbent re-elected on an unknown date.
| nowrap | 

|-
! 

|-
! 

|}

See also 
 1834 United States elections
 List of United States House of Representatives elections (1824–1854)
 1834–35 United States Senate elections
 23rd United States Congress
 24th United States Congress

Notes

References

Bibliography

External links 
 Office of the Historian (Office of Art & Archives, Office of the Clerk, U.S. House of Representatives)